is a passenger railway station located in the Takebe-chō neighborhood of Kita-ku of the city of Okayama, Okayama Prefecture, Japan. It is operated by West Japan Railway Company (JR West).

Lines

Station layout
The station consists of two opposed ground-level side platforms connected by a level crossing.  The wooden station building is located on the side of Platform 2, And a waiting room is located on Platform 1. The station is unattended.  The station building received protection by the national government as a Registered Tangible Cultural Property in 2006.

Platforms

Adjacent stations

History
Takebe Station opened on April 14, 1900 with donations collected by local citizens' movement to open a new station.  The station was used as the setting for the 1998 Japanese Comedy-drama film Dr. Akagi by director Shohei Imamura. With the privatization of the Japan National Railways (JNR) on April 1, 1987, the station came under the aegis of the West Japan Railway Company.

Passenger statistics
In fiscal 2019, the station was used by an average of 184 passengers daily..

Surrounding area
Okayama Municipal Takebe Junior High School
Okayama Municipal Takebe Nursery School
Takebe Town Cultural Center

See also
List of railway stations in Japan

References

External links

 Takebe Station Official Site

Railway stations in Okayama
Tsuyama Line
Railway stations in Japan opened in 1900
Registered Tangible Cultural Properties